Operation Silver Wake was a non-combatant evacuation operation (NEO) led by the United States to evacuate American citizens, noncombatants and designated third country nationals from Albania in March 1997. The operation was performed by U.S. Marines from the 26th Marine Expeditionary Unit conducting operations from the  Amphibious Readiness Group. U.S. Marines from 1st Battalion, 8th Marines secured the U.S. housing compound and held the U.S. Embassy. Over 900 personnel were evacuated during the course of the operation.

Some of the awards presented to participating units included the Meritorious Unit Commendation, Joint Meritorious Unit Award and the Humanitarian Service Medal.  Selected Marines were also awarded the Combat Action Ribbon.

See also
Albanian Rebellion of 1997
Operation Libelle

References

 DOD Archive
 Article from www.globalsecurity.org

Albanian Civil War
Conflicts in 1997
Silver Wake
20th-century military history of the United States
United States Marine Corps in the 20th century
March 1997 events in Europe
Non-combatant evacuation operations